San Aye (born 20 June 1954) is a Burmese footballer. He competed in the men's tournament at the 1972 Summer Olympics.

References

External links
 

1954 births
Living people
Burmese footballers
Myanmar international footballers
Olympic footballers of Myanmar
Footballers at the 1972 Summer Olympics
Place of birth missing (living people)
Association football defenders